Charles Louis Ormond (December 30, 1932 – November 24, 2017) was an American politician who was a member for four terms in the Arkansas House of Representatives.

References

1932 births
2017 deaths
Democratic Party members of the Arkansas House of Representatives
University of Arkansas alumni
20th-century American politicians
21st-century American politicians